Harm Kuipers (born 22 November 1947) is a former speed skater from the Netherlands.

Kuipers combined his sports careers with being a Medicine student at the University of Groningen. Preferring his studies over speed skating, he did not participate in the 1972 Winter Olympics, a decision he still regrets today. The best year of his speed skating career was 1975, when he became World Allround Champion, after having won silver the year before. From 1971 to 1976, Kuipers also was a successful amateur bicycle racer.

In December 1973 he married speed skater Marrie Willems in Norg. He had a son with her in 1974 and a daughter Margreet in 1975. They lived in Haren.

Apart from combining his studies with his sports careers, another thing that set Kuipers apart was that he was his own coach, something that was in line with his later scientific career. After winning his world title in 1975, Kuipers concentrated on his scientific career, receiving his M.Sc. in Medicine from the University of Groningen in 1975, a Ph.D. in Physiology from the University of Maastricht in 1983, and he became a full professor at the University of Maastricht in 1992 at the Faculty of Health, Medicine and Life Sciences – Department of Human Movement Sciences. Until 2012, he was a professor of Human Movement Sciences at the University of Maastricht where much of his research focused on the health aspects of physical activity, energy metabolism during exercise, and nutrition.

Since 2000, Kuipers has been a medical advisor to the International Skating Union. From 2000 to 2003, he was member of the list committee of the World Anti-Doping Agency. He also is a member of the medical committee of the International Olympic Committee and an advisor to the Sports Physiotherapy For All (SPA) Project of the International Federation of Sports Physiotherapy (IFSP).

Early in 2010 Kuipers was diagnosed with prostate cancer. He is open about his illness and has talked about it on regional television. Being a doctor he is keen on helping other patients, which is why he wishes to share his own experiences with this disease. Kuipers hopes to beat the statistics for people with prostate cancer. End of 2011 a second cancer, esophagus cancer, was found.

Personal records

 World record at the time was 38.0
World record at the time was 1:17.23
World record at the time was 1:58.7
World record at the time was 4:08.3
World record at the time was 7:09.8
World record at the time was 14:55.9
 World record at the time was 167.420 

Kuipers has an Adelskalender score of 171.584 points.

Tournament overview

 NC = No classification
 DNQ = Did not qualify for the final distance
source:

Medals won

Decoration

In 2010 Kuipers was awarded the Dutch Order of Chivalry of Orange-Nassau which is granted for those who have earned special merits for society.

References

External links
 Harm Kuipers at SkateResults.com
 Personal records from Jakub Majerski's Speedskating Database
 Evert Stenlund's Adelskalender pages

1947 births
Living people
People from Noordenveld
Dutch male speed skaters
Universiade medalists in speed skating
University of Groningen alumni
Maastricht University alumni
Academic staff of Maastricht University
World Anti-Doping Agency members
World Allround Speed Skating Championships medalists
Universiade silver medalists for the Netherlands
Competitors at the 1972 Winter Universiade
Sportspeople from Drenthe